David T. Friendly (born May 1, 1956) is an American film producer best known for co-producing the 2006 film Little Miss Sunshine, for which he was nominated for an Academy Award for Best Picture.

Career
After graduating from Northwestern University's Medill School of Journalism in 1978, Friendly became a journalist, a staff writer at newsmagazine Newsweek. He moved to the Los Angeles Times in 1985 where he wrote about the entertainment industry and had a weekly column exploring the business side of the film industry until 1987, when he was approached by Imagine Entertainment co-founders Brian Grazer and Ron Howard, and he became Imagine's Vice President of Motion Pictures. With Imagine, he executive produced My Girl, My Girl 2, For Love or Money, Greedy, and The Chamber. In 1994, Friendly joined Davis Entertainment as President, where he produced Daylight and Digging to China, as well as overseeing the development and production of many other Davis films. With his own independent company, Friendly Productions, he has produced the 2000 film Here on Earth. Friendly and producer/financier Marc Turtletaub founded Deep River Productions in September 2000 and, after working at 20th Century Fox for three years where he produced Big Momma's House, they produced their first feature, Laws of Attraction.

Friendly went on to produce Duane Hopwood, The Honeymooners and Big Momma's House 2 with Deep River under different labels before producing the 2006 film Little Miss Sunshine with Turtletaub, Ron Yerxa, Albert Berger and Peter Saraf, for which they were all nominated for an Academy Award for Best Picture and a BAFTA Award for Best Film, as well as winning an Independent Spirit Award for Best Feature and a PGA Award for a Theatrical Motion Picture. After the release of Little Miss Sunshine, which had been in production at Deep River Productions for six years, Friendly and Turtletaub split and left the company to work elsewhere and Friendly made a two-year producing deal with 20th Century Fox that landed him producing roles on the 2008 film Meet Dave and Big Mommas: Like Father, Like Son. He is also set to produce the upcoming projects Office Romance, Q School, and The Warden.

Personal life
Friendly is the son of Jewish American journalist Fred W. Friendly, the president of CBS News from 1964 to 1966 (whom George Clooney portrayed in the 2005 film Good Night, and Good Luck). His brother is fellow producer Andy Friendly. He is married to film editor Priscilla Nedd-Friendly.

Filmography

Film

Television

References

External links

Profile of David T. Friendly by Northwestern Magazine

1956 births
Living people
American film producers
Medill School of Journalism alumni